Chen Zhibin (born 21 October 1962) is a Chinese former international table tennis player and current coach.

He won a bronze medal at the 1989 World Table Tennis Championships in the mixed doubles with Gao Jun.

In 2000, Chen Zhibin became a German citizen and represented Germany. From 2011-2014 he worked as national coach in the Netherlands for the women's and since 2016 he  has been the national coach of the women's team in Singapore.

See also
 List of table tennis players
 List of World Table Tennis Championships medalists

References

External links
 

Naturalised table tennis players
Table tennis players from Xinjiang
Chinese male table tennis players
German male table tennis players
Living people
1962 births
Asian Games medalists in table tennis
Table tennis players at the 1990 Asian Games
Asian Games gold medalists for China
Asian Games bronze medalists for China
Medalists at the 1990 Asian Games
World Table Tennis Championships medalists
German table tennis coaches